The Asia/Oceania Zone was the unique zone within Group 4 of the regional Davis Cup competition in 2016. The zone's competition was held in round robin format in Amman, Jordan, in July 2016. Two nations won promotion to Group III, Asia/Oceania Zone, for 2017.

Participating nations

Inactive nations

Draw
Date: 11–16 July 2016

Location: Al-Hussein Sport City, Amman, Jordan (clay)

Format: Round-robin basis. Two pools of four and five teams, respectively (Pools A and B). The winner of each pool plays off against the runner-up of the other pool to determine which two nations are promoted to Asia/Oceania Zone Group III in 2017.

Seeding: The seeding was based on the Davis Cup Rankings of 7 March 2016 (shown in parentheses below).

{| class="wikitable"
!width=25%|Pot 1
!width=25%|Pot 2
!width=25%|Pot 3
!width=25%|Pot 4
|-
|
  (98)
  (106)
|
   (107)
  (116)
|
   (117)
  (120)
|
   (121)
  (124)
  (–)
|}

Group A

Group B

First round

Group A

United Arab Emirates vs. Myanmar

Saudi Arabia vs. Oman

United Arab Emirates vs. Oman

Saudi Arabia vs. Myanmar

United Arab Emirates vs. Saudi Arabia

Oman vs. Myanmar

Group B

Jordan vs. Mongolia

Iraq vs. Tajikistan

Bahrain vs. Mongolia

Jordan vs. Tajikistan

Iraq vs. Mongolia

Jordan vs. Bahrain

Tajikistan vs. Mongolia

Iraq vs. Bahrain

Jordan vs. Iraq

Bahrain vs. Tajikistan

Play-offs

Promotional

United Arab Emirates vs. Bahrain

Oman vs. Jordan

5th−6th

Saudi Arabia vs. Iraq

7th−8th

Myanmar vs. Tajikistan

References

External links
Official Website

Asia/Oceania Zone Group IV
Davis Cup Asia/Oceania Zone